Joseph is a masculine given name.

Joseph may also refer to:

Religion
 Joseph (Genesis), an important figure in the Bible's Book of Genesis
 Joseph in Islam, an important figure in Islam mentioned in the Qur'an 
 Saint Joseph, a figure in the gospels who was married to Mary, Jesus' mother, and was Jesus' legal father
 Joseph (Book of Mormon), a priest and a younger brother of the Prophets Nephi and Jacob
 Joseph (Dean of Armagh), Dean of Armagh in 1257
 Joseph of Panephysis, Egyptian Christian monk who lived around the 4th and 5th centuries
 Joseph (Nestorian patriarch), Patriarch of the Church of the East from 552 to 567

Places

United States 
 Joseph, Idaho, a ghost town
 Joseph, Oregon, a city
 Joseph, Utah, a town
 Joseph Canyon, in Oregon and Washington
 Joseph City, Arizona, an unincorporated community
 Joseph Peak, Yellowstone National Park, Montana

Arts and entertainment
 Joseph (opera), by the French composer Étienne Méhul
 Joseph (1995 film), a German/Italian/American television movie from 1995, which tells the story of Joseph in the Hebrew Bible
 Prophet Joseph (TV series), an Iranian TV series
 Joseph (2018 film), a 2018 Indian Malayalam-language film
 Joseph: King of Dreams, a 2000 direct-to-video animated musical film
 Joseph (comics), a Marvel Comics character who was briefly a member of the X-Men
 Joseph, a member of the Saint Shields in the animated series Beyblade: V-Force
 Joseph (band), a vocal trio from Oregon
 Joseph and the Amazing Technicolor Dreamcoat, a 1968 musical by Tim Rice and Andrew Lloyd Webber
 Joseph Joestar, a fictional character from JoJo's Bizarre Adventure
 Joseph Korso, a fictional character from the 2000 animated film Titan A.E.

Other uses
 Joseph (surname)
Joseph (fashion brand), a retailer founded by Joseph Ettedgui
 Joseph, the formal name of Big Joe, a church bell
Joseph (art model), art model in France

See also
 
 Joseph Joseph, an English houseware manufacturer founded in 2003
 Joseph & Joseph, an architectural firm founded in 1908 in Louisville, Kentucky
 Saint Joseph (disambiguation)
 YosepH, a 2003 album by Luke Vibert
 Joesef, a Scottish singer